The uranium mining debate covers the political and environmental controversies of uranium mining for use in either nuclear power or nuclear weapons.

Background and public debate
As of 2009, in terms of uranium production, Kazakhstan was the largest supplier to export markets (27%), followed by Canada (20%) and Australia (16%). Australia has 23% of the world's uranium ore reserves and the world's largest single uranium deposit, located at the Olympic Dam Mine in South Australia. 
 
The years 1976 and 1977 saw uranium mining become a major political issue in Australia, with the Ranger Inquiry (Fox) report opening up a public debate about uranium mining. The Movement Against Uranium Mining group was formed in 1976, and many protests and demonstrations against uranium mining were held.  Concerns relate to the health risks and environmental damage from uranium mining.

In 1977, the National Conference of the Australian Labor Party (ALP) passed a motion in favour of an indefinite moratorium on uranium mining, and the anti-nuclear movement in Australia acted to support the Labor Party and help it regain office. However, after the ALP won power in 1983, the 1984 ALP conference voted in favour of a "Three mine policy".
 
Australia has three operating uranium mines at Olympic Dam (Roxby) and Beverley - both in South Australia's north - and at Ranger in the Northern Territory. As of April 2009, construction has begun on South Australia's fourth uranium mine—the Honeymoon Uranium Mine.

The Rössing Uranium Mine located in Namibia is the world's longest-operating open-pit uranium mine. The uranium mill tailings dam has been leaking for a number of years, and on January 17, 2014, a catastrophic structural failure of a leach tank caused a major spill. The France-based laboratory, Commission de Recherche et d'Information Independentantes sur la Radioactivite (CRIIAD) reported elevated levels of radioactive materials in the area surrounding the mine.

Notable anti-uranium activists include Golden Misabiko (Democratic Republic of the Congo), Kevin Buzzacott (Australia), Jacqui Katona (Australia), Yvonne Margarula (Australia), Jillian Marsh (Australia), Manuel Pino (US), JoAnn Tall (US), and Sun Xiaodi (China). There have been many reports about working conditions at the mine, and the effects on the mine laborers.

Health risks of uranium mining 

Because uranium ore emits radon gas, uranium mining can be more dangerous than other underground mining, unless adequate ventilation systems are installed. During the 1950s, many Navajos in the U.S. became uranium miners, as many uranium deposits were discovered on Navajo reservations. A statistically significant subset of these early miners later developed small cell carcinoma after exposure to uranium ore.  Radon-222, a natural decay product of uranium, has been shown to be the cancer-causing agent.  Some American survivors and their descendants have received compensation under the Radiation Exposure Compensation Act which was enacted in 1990, and as of 2016 continues to receive and award claims. Successful claimants have include uranium miners, mill workers and ore transporters.

Residues from processing of uranium ore can also be a source of Radon. Radon resulting from the high radium content in uncovered dumps and tailing ponds can be easily released into the atmosphere.

Also possible is the contamination of ground water and surface water with uranium by leaching processes. In July 2011, the World Health Organization (WHO) released the fourth edition of its guidelines for drinking-water quality. The drinking water guidance level for uranium was increased to 30 μg/L. This limit can be exceeded near mill tailings or mining sites.

Tetravalent uranium is commonly assumed to form insoluble species and such strategy was employed to reduce the risk of uranium leakage near mining sites. However, the presence of U(IV) in soil bound to amorphous Al-P-Fe-Si aggregates as a non-crystalline species was detected by Rizlan Bernier-Latmani and coworkers into a stream that joined a mining-impacted wetland in France, raising suspicious that phenomena of uranium leakage could be greater than previously imagined.

In January 2008 Areva was nominated for an Anti Oscar Award. The French state-owned company mines uranium in northern Niger where mine workers are not informed about health risks, and analysis shows radioactive contamination of air, water and soil. The local organization that represents the mine workers spoke of "suspicious deaths among the workers, caused by radioactive dust and contaminated groundwater".

Uranium mining and indigenous people

Large-scale uranium mining operations throughout the world have had a significant impact on indigenous peoples and their ways of life, raising questions concerning economic development of "remote regions" in relation to the impact on traditions life styles of these cultures, and resulting health and environmental hazards. The Jabiluka uranium mine is located in Kakadu National Park, Australia, is a World Heritage Site and home to the Mirrar Aboriginal culture. A dispute exists between the mining industry, the Mirrar people represented by Yvonne Margarula, ecologists and politicians on the implications of postcolonialism in relation to the impacts on the health and vitality of humans and other species, and effects on scarce water resources.  The impact of uranium mining, milling and processing for India's burgeoning nuclear power industry has created controversy between indigenous peoples and mining and energy development. Winona LaDuke, spokesperson for Native Americans and First Nations has written extensively on the impact of uranium mining on indigenous communities. The Jackpile Uranium Mine was the world's largest open-pit uranium mine until its closure in the 1980s. The mine, located on Laguna Pueblo land in New Mexico covered approximately 2,500 acres, and employed Laguna, Canyoncito, Acoma and Zuni Pueblo people, as well as the Navajo.

See also
Church Rock uranium mill spill
Environmental racism
Nuclear labor issues
Nuclear power debate
Nuclear weapons debate
The Navajo People and Uranium Mining
The Return of Navajo Boy

References

Uranium mining
Environmental impact of mining
Uranium politics